Cinemagic is an album by American pianist Dave Grusin released in 1987, recorded for the GRP label. The album features Grusin's work as a film composer.

Track listing
All songs composed by Dave Grusin except where noted.

"On Golden Pond" (main theme from On Golden Pond) - 3:35
"New Hampshire Hornpipe" (from On Golden Pond) - 2:22
"Heaven Can Wait" (main theme from Heaven Can Wait) - 4:35
"An Actor's Life" (main theme from Tootsie) - 5:07
"It Might Be You" - (Dave Grusin, Alan Bergman, Marilyn Bergman) (from Tootsie) - 5:08
"Fratelli Chase" (from The Goonies) - 3:15
"The Heart is a Lonely Hunter" (from The Heart is a Lonely Hunter) - 4:40
"Mountain Dance" (main theme from Falling in Love) - 6:14
"Letting Go - T.J.'s Theme" (from The Champ) - 2:51
"The Champ" (main theme from The Champ) - 3:25
"Condor" (from Three Days of the Condor) - 4:42
"Goodbye for Cathy" (from Three Days of the Condor) - 3:57
"PLO Camp Entrance" (from The Little Drummer Girl) - 2:51
"Epilogue" (from The Little Drummer Girl) - 3:22

Personnel
 Dave Grusin – acoustic piano, midi–acoustic piano, synthesizers, conductor
 Don Grusin – synthesizers
 Lee Ritenour – acoustic and electric guitars
 Abraham Laboriel – bass
 Harvey Mason – drums
 Mike Fisher – percussion
 Emil Richards – additional percussion
 Ted Jensen at Sterling Sound, New York City – mastering

Charts

References

External links
Dave Grusin-Cinemagic at Discogs
Dave Grusin-Cinemagic at AllMusic

1987 albums
GRP Records albums
Dave Grusin albums